Diwan Sir Abdul Hamid (also known as Khan Bahadur Abdul Hamid) born in Jalandhar was the Prime Minister of Kapurthala Princely State in India under the British Raj.

References

People from Kapurthala